Teresa Pàmies i Bertran (8 October 1919 – 13 March 2012) was a Spanish Catalan-language writer.

Prominent among her works, always with an autobiographical background, were Testament a Praga (1970), Quan érem capitans (1974), Va ploure tot el dia (1974), Gent del meu exili (1975), a biography of Dolores Ibárruri in Spanish (Mexico, 1975), and Jardí enfonsat (1992). In 1984 she received the Creu de Sant Jordi awarded by  Generalitat de Catalunya autonomous government. In 2000 she received the Gold Medal for artistic merit of the City Council of Barcelona.

Biography
Teresa Pàmies was born in Balaguer, Noguera district in 1919. She also participated in the creation of the National Alliance of Dona Jove (1937–1939) and wrote for the bulletin Juliol.

With the Republican defeat, she marched into exile with her father, leaving her mother and brothers in Balaguer. The experience of leaving the wounded of Barcelona's Vallcarca Hospital, which she told of in her book Quan èrem capitans (1974), would not leave her. She joined the half million people fleeing from Catalonia to France, a march that in her case passed through Girona and Olot until, at 19, she entered the Magnac-Laval refugee camp, near Limoges. There she participated in the organization of internees and the creation of a school until, with the help of her party, she managed to flee. In Paris prior to the German occupation, she was imprisoned for three months in La Roquette as an illegal immigrant. Once released, she went to Bordeaux to join the Republicans who traveled to the Dominican Republic of Rafael Trujillo. Then she went to Cuba, where she heard about the execution of President Lluís Companys, and from Cuba she traveled to Mexico. In Mexico, she established her residency for eight years and studied journalism at the Universidad Femenina. In 1947 she managed to return to Europe, first spending one year working at Radio Belgrade, and then twelve in Czechoslovakia. There she worked as editor of the Catalan and Spanish broadcasts of Radio Prague.

In 1971 she returned to Catalonia thanks to a visa to receive the Josep Pla Award for the book Testament a Praga, written jointly with her father.

Teresa Pàmies died on 13 March 2012 at age 92 at the home of her son Antonio in Granada.

Works
 Testament a Praga 1970)
 Quan érem capitans (1974)
 Va ploure tot el dia (1974) 
 Quan èrem refugiats (1975)
 Si vas a París papà... (1975)
 Gent del meu exili (1975)
 Gent de la vetlla (1975)
 Los que se fueron (1976)
 Dona de pressa (1975)
 Amor clandestí (1976)
 Aquell vellet senzill i pulcre (1977)
 Vacances aragoneses  (1979)  
 La chivata (1981)
 Memòria dels morts (1981)
 Aventura mexicana del noi Pau Rispa (1982)
 Matins d'Aran  (1982)
 Rosalia no hi era (1982)
 Busqueu-me a Granada (1984)
 Segrest amb filipina (1986)
 Praga (Collection "Las ciudades", Ed. Destino) (1987) 
 Primavera de l'àvia  (1989)
 Jardí enfonsat (1992)
 Coses de la vida a ritme de bolero (1993)
 Nadal a Porto  (1994)
 La filla del Gudari (1997)
 La vida amb cançó: cròniques radiofòniques  (1999)
 Estem en guerra (2005)
 Ràdio Pirenaica (2007)
 Inform al difunt (2008)

References

External links
 Teresa Pàmies at the Associació d'Escriptors en Llengua Catalana
 Teresa Pàmies at LletrA, Catalan Literature Online (Open University of Catalonia).

1919 births
2012 deaths
20th-century Spanish women writers
21st-century Spanish women writers
Women writers from Catalonia
Writers from Catalonia
Exiles of the Spanish Civil War in Cuba
Exiles of the Spanish Civil War in France
Exiles of the Spanish Civil War in Mexico
Exiles of the Spanish Civil War in the Dominican Republic
People from Noguera (comarca)
Spanish biographers
Spanish communists
Spanish women journalists
Women biographers